Isang Bala, Isang Buhay is a 1989 Filipino action film co-written and directed by Jose N. Carreon. The film stars Ramon "Bong" Revilla Jr., Tony Ferrer, Dawn Zulueta, Suzanne Gonzales, Rosemarie Gil, Paquito Diaz, Ruben Rustia, Subas Herrero, Dencio Padilla, and Ilonnah Jean. Produced by Viva Films, the film was released on November 2, 1989.

Critic Justino Dormiendo of the National Midweek gave the film a negative review, criticizing its cliché plot that fictionalizes the real story it is based on.

Cast
Ramon "Bong" Revilla Jr. as Daniel Zarragoza
Dawn Zulueta as Dolores
Tony Ferrer as Roman
Suzanne Gonzales as Celis
Rosemarie Gil as Dolores' Mother
Romeo Rivera as Dolores' Father
Paquito Diaz as Rigor
Ruben Rustia as Don Honorio
Subas Herrero as Mr. Abad
Dencio Padilla as Mang Doming
Ilonnah Jean as Maita
George Estregan Jr. as ex-commando
Rez Cortez as Ex-Commando
Robert Talabis as Capt. Omar
Bing Davao as Ex-Commando
Mon Godiz as Ex-Commando
Edwin Reyes as Ex-Commando
Roldan Aquino as Lt. Roldan
RR Herrera as Monching
Rudy Meyer as Barbie
Mario Escudero as Mr. Zulueta
Arthur Santamaria as Arvee

Production
Isang Bala, Isang Buhay is actress Ilonah Jean's first film for Viva Films.

Release
Isang Bala, Isang Buhay was released in theaters on November 2, 1989.

Critical response
Justino Dormiendo, writing for the National Midweek, gave the film a negative review. He criticized the film's tired plot of "gold-hearted goons forced to embrace a life of crime and mayhem" which fictionalizes the true story from which it is based, and noted that Daniel's principle of using only one bullet for every opponent makes the film absurd "as soon as Revilla guns down his second victim." He also considered the actor's performances to be "barely passable." Overall, Dormiendo expressed disappointment in the film due to director Carreon previously demonstrating his filmmaking skills through his "brilliantly-scripted" Broken Marriage (1983) and "impressive directorial debut" Sandakot Na Bala (1988).

References

External links

1989 films
1989 action films
Action films based on actual events
Filipino-language films
Films about organized crime in the Philippines
Films set in Ilocos Norte
Films set in Metro Manila
Philippine action films
Viva Films films